is a Japanese politician and the current mayor of Matsuyama, the capital city of Ehime Prefecture, Japan.

References

External links
  

1967 births
Living people
Mayors of places in Japan
Politicians from Ehime Prefecture